Mary Jane Keeney (1898–1969) and her husband Philip Olin Keeney were librarians and charter members of the liberal The Progressive Librarians Council.  She worked at the Board of Economic Warfare in Washington D.C. during World War II. In November 1945, Keeney travelled to Europe to work with the Allied Staff on Reparations.

She was alleged to be passing information to the Soviet Union through Joseph Milton Bernstein. After the war Keeney worked at the United Nations. Deciphered Venona cables and her own diaries corroborate the fact that Keeney and her husband, Philip Keeney, both worked for the GRU.  Keeney's diary details that Sergey Kurnakov became their new KGB handler.

In February 1950, Senator Joseph McCarthy accused Keeney of being a member of the Communist Party, not an agent serving a foreign government. By the end of 1950, Keeney lost her position with the United Nations. She was convicted of contempt of Congress. However, the decision was overturned upon appeal.

The Keeneys then opened a theatre in Greenwich Village called Club Cinema to air mostly foreign-language titles, with occasional live performances.  Mary Jane died in 1969 at the age of seventy-one.  She was preceded by her husband.

Sources

 

1898 births
1969 deaths
American spies for the Soviet Union
American people in the Venona papers
Espionage in the United States
American librarianship and human rights